is a museum dedicated to the life and works of poet Nakahara Chūya in Yamaguchi, Yamaguchi Prefecture, Japan. Located on the site of his birthplace (other than for a storehouse and chashitsu, the original buildings were destroyed by fire in 1972), the museum opened in 1994.

See also

 Yamaguchi Prefectural Museum
 Labyrinth of Cinema

References

External links
  Nakahara Chūya Memorial Museum
  Nakahara Chūya Memorial Museum

Museums in Yamaguchi Prefecture
Literary museums in Japan
Biographical museums in Japan
Yamaguchi (city)
Museums established in 1994
1994 establishments in Japan